Cobblestone is a natural building material based on cobble-sized stones, and is used for pavement roads, streets, and buildings.

Setts, also called Belgian blocks, are often casually referred to as "cobbles", although a sett is distinct from a cobblestone by being quarried or shaped to a regular form, whereas cobblestone is generally of a naturally occurring form and is less uniform in size.

Use in roading

Cobblestones are typically either set in sand or similar material, or are bound together with mortar. Paving with cobblestones allows a road to be heavily used all year long. It prevents the build-up of ruts often found in dirt roads. It has the additional advantage of immediately draining water, and not getting muddy in wet weather or dusty in dry weather. Shod horses are also able to get better traction on stone cobbles, pitches or setts than tarmac or asphalt. The fact that carriage wheels, horse hooves and even modern automobiles make a lot of noise when rolling over cobblestone paving might be thought a disadvantage, but it has the advantage of warning pedestrians of their approach. In England, the custom was to strew straw over the cobbles outside the house of a sick or dying person to dampen the sound.

Cobblestones set in sand have the environmental advantage of being permeable paving, and of moving rather than cracking with movements in the ground.

Use today
Cobblestones were largely replaced by quarried granite setts (also known as Belgian block) in the nineteenth century. The word cobblestone is often used to describe such treatment. Setts were relatively even and roughly rectangular stones that were laid in regular patterns. They gave a smoother ride for carts than cobbles, although in heavily used sections, such as in yards and the like, the usual practice was to replace the setts by parallel granite slabs set apart by the standard axle length of the time.

In England, it was commonplace since ancient times for flat stones with a flat narrow edge to be set on edge to provide an even paved surface. This was known as a 'pitched' surface and was common all over Britain, as it did not require rounded pebbles. Pitched surfaces predate the use of regularly-sized granite setts by more than a thousand years. Such pitched paving is quite distinct from that formed from rounded stones, although both forms are commonly referred to as 'cobbled' surfaces. Most surviving genuinely old 'cobbled' areas are in reality pitched surfaces. A cobbled area is known as a "causey", "cassay" or "cassie" in Scots (probably from causeway).

Cobblestoned and "setted" streets gradually gave way to macadam roads, and later to tarmac, and finally to asphalt concrete at the beginning of the 20th century. However, cobble­stones are often retained in historic areas, even for streets with modern vehicular traffic. Many older villages and cities in Europe are still paved with cobblestones or pitched.

In recent decades, cobblestones have become a popular material for paving newly pedestrianised streets in Europe. In this case, the noisy nature of the surface is an advantage as pedestrians can hear approaching vehicles. The visual cues of the cobblestones also clarify that the area is more than just a normal street. The use of cobblestones/setts is also considered to be a more "upmarket" roadway solution, having been described as "unique and artistic" compared to the normal asphalt road environment.

In older U.S. cities such as Philadelphia, Boston, Pittsburgh, New York City, Chicago, San Francisco, New Castle, Portland (Maine), Baltimore, Charleston, and New Orleans, many of the older streets are paved in cobblestones and setts (mostly setts); however, many such streets have been paved over with asphalt, which can crack and erode away due to heavy traffic, thus revealing the original stone pavement.

In some places such as Saskatoon, Saskatchewan, Canada, as late as the 1990s some busy intersections still showed cobblestones through worn down sections of pavement. In Toronto streets using setts were used by streetcar routes and disappeared by the 1980s, but are still found in the Distillery District.

Many cities in Latin America, such as Buenos Aires, Argentina; Zacatecas and Guanajuato, in Mexico; Old San Juan, Puerto Rico; Philippines, Vigan; and Montevideo, Uruguay, are well known for their many cobblestone streets, which are still operational and in good condition. They are still maintained and repaired in the traditional manner, by placing and arranging granite stones by hand.

In the Czech Republic, there are old cobblestone paths with colored marbles and limestones. The design with three colors (red/limestone, black/limestone, white/marble) has a long tradition in Bohemia. The cubes of the old ways are handmade.

Use in architecture

In the Finger Lakes Region of New York State, the retreat of the glaciers during the last ice age left numerous small, rounded cobblestones available for building.  Pre-Civil War architecture in the region made heavy use of cobblestones for walls.  Today, the fewer than 600 remaining cobblestone buildings are prized as historic locations, most of them private homes. Ninety percent of the cobblestone buildings in America can be found within a 75-mile radius of Rochester, New York. There is also a cluster of cobblestone buildings in the Town of Paris, Ontario. In addition to homes, cobblestones were used to build barns, stagecoach taverns, smokehouses, stores, churches, schools, factories, and cemetery markers.

The only public cobblestone building in the US is the Alexander Classical School, located in Alexander, New York.

Use in cycling

In cycling road races, cobblestones are used as an additional difficulty for the riders. It requires a certain skill to ride cobblestones efficiently, without falling or getting a flat tire. Tour of Flanders and Paris–Roubaix are notable cobbled classics.

See also
 Calade, a harmonious, decorative arrangement of medium-sized pebbles, fixed to the ground
 Flagstone
 Portuguese pavement
 List of cobblestone streets
 List of cobblestone buildings

References

External links 

 The Cobblestone Society & Museum - Albion, New York

Building stone
Natural materials
Pavements
Stone (material)